Binnamangala Manavarthe Kaval or B. M. Kaval is one of the early settlements in Bengaluru. It is part of C. V. Raman Nagar Assembly constituency in East Bengaluru. This former village was considered as Outgrowth of Bangalore city in 1981 and had a population of 10516 in 1991 Census, finally merged with Bangalore Mahanagara Palike on 7 December 1995. The process was completed by April 2007 and the body was renamed Bruhat Bengaluru Mahanagara Palike (Greater Bangalore Municipal Corporation).

Location

References

Neighbourhoods in Bangalore